The Miniss River is a river in the Unorganized Part of Thunder Bay District in Northwestern Ontario, Canada. The river is part of the James Bay drainage basin and is a tributary of Lake St. Joseph.

The river begins at an unnamed lake and flows north to Hill Lake. It turns southwest to Yam Lake, then flows northeast through Hooker Lake and Arc Lake to Miniss Lake, where it takes in the right tributary De Lesseps River. The river heads north, takes in the left tributary St. Raphael River, and reaches its mouth at Miniss Bay on Lake St. Joseph, the source of the Albany River, which flows to James Bay.

Tributaries
St. Raphael River
De Lesseps River

References

Sources

Rivers of Thunder Bay District